Saptakoshi Municipality (Nepali: सप्तकोशी नगरपालिका) is located in Saptari District in the Province 2 of Nepal. It was formed in 2014 and then again modified in 2016 occupying current 11 sections (wards) from previous 11 wards.

References 

Populated places in Saptari District
Nepal municipalities established in 2014
Municipalities in Madhesh Province